The coins of Mahmud Ghazni struck in India with Arabic and Sanskrit legends on obverse and reverse respectively, show a number of varieties in so far as the legends, the dates and the lettering and its arrangements are concerned.

Ghaznavid  control largely continued in the existing administrative system. Thus Ghaznavid coins issued in North western India have bilingual legends written in Arabic and Sharda scripts . Some carry Islamic titles together with the portrayal of the Shaiva Bull, Nandi and the legend Shri samta deva. The reference in the latter remains ambiguous . A dirham struck at Lahore carries a legend in the Sharda script and a rendering in colloquial Sanskrit of the Islamic Kalima.

See also
Ghaznavid

References

External links
Bi-Lingual Jital, 1041-1050 A.D.

Coins by country
Ghaznavid Empire
Economic history of Afghanistan